The Emperor's New Groove is a Disney media franchise that started in 2000 with the release of the animated feature film of the same name, produced by Walt Disney Feature Animation and released by Walt Disney Pictures.

Films
The Emperor's New Groove is a 2000 American animated comedy film produced by Walt Disney Animation Studios and released by Walt Disney Pictures on December 15, 2000. It is the 40th Disney animated feature film.
Kronk's New Groove, also known as The Emperor's New Groove 2: Kronk's New Groove, is a 2005 direct-to-video animated musical comedy film released by The Walt Disney Company on December 13, 2005. The film is the sequel and spin-off to the 2000 animated film The Emperor's New Groove.

Documentary films
The Sweatbox is a documentary designed to show behind the scenes footage of Kingdom of the Sun. In reality, it illustrated the slow and painful transformation from Kingdom of the Sun to The Emperor's New Groove, including the director, Sting (whose wife created the documentary), artists, and voice cast being dismayed by the new direction. Its major theme is creative-executive conflicts.

Unproduced film
Kingdom of the Sun was the original draft of the film that went through massive changes and eventually became The Emperor's New Groove. It is considered a different film despite being vaguely cosmetically reminiscent of the finished one. It was described as being an epic film on par with The Lion King as opposed to the buddy comedy it became. The plot was more akin to The Prince and the Pauper and focused on llama herder Pacha (voiced by Owen Wilson) and emperor Manco Capac (still voiced by Spade) discovering their visual similarities and switching places with one another. Yzma (still voiced by Kitt) was an evil witch and vizier who would transform Manco into a llama so that she could use him for the annual sacrifice and summon the shadow demon Supai to block out the sun and restore her youth. Much of the animation and even original audio can be seen in The Sweatbox documentary. Following the success of the #ReleaseTheSnyderCut movement, fans have started the similarly named #ReleaseTheAllersCut movement for Disney to complete and release the original film.

TV series
The Emperor's New School is an American animated television series that aired on Disney Channel. The show is based on the characters from The Emperor's New Groove and its direct-to-video sequel Kronk's New Groove, with several contradictions to both films. It aired from 2006-2008.

Video games
The Emperor's New Groove is a video game based upon the 2000 film of the same name, developed by Argonaut Games for the PlayStation and Microsoft Windows, and by Sandbox Studios for the Game Boy Color.
The Emperor's New Groove Groove Center is a part of the Disney's Activity Center series, which allows the player to do activities that tie into the film upon what it is based.

Music
The Emperor's New Groove is the soundtrack to the film, which included many songs that were originally written for Kingdom of the Sun and then discarded.
My Funny Friend and Me is a song by English musician Sting. It was written by Sting and David Hartley, and received an Academy Award nomination for Best Original Song at the 73rd Academy Awards in 2001.
Snuff out the Light was the deleted villain song from Kingdom of the Sun, to be sung by Yzma (played by Eartha Kitt). It demonstrated that she thought light made people age, so if she could force the world into total darkness she could be beautiful and young forever.

Other media
Kuzco, Pacha, Yzma and the Royal Recordkeeper have guest appearances in the animated television series House of Mouse. Kuzco also appears in the series' direct-to-video film Mickey's Magical Christmas: Snowed in at the House of Mouse.
In the world builder video game Disney Magic Kingdoms, Kuzco, Pacha, Yzma and Kronk appear as playable characters, as well as attractions based on Mudka's Meat Hut and Yzma's Lair, being unlocked during the progress of the game's main storyline. In the game the characters are involved in new storylines that serve as a continuation of The Emperor's New Groove (ignoring other material in the franchise).

Common elements

Cast and characters

Crew

References

 
Walt Disney Studios (division) franchises
Film series introduced in 2000